Prasophyllum perangustum, commonly known as the Knocklofty leek orchid, is a species of orchid endemic to Tasmania. It has a single tubular, dark green leaf and up to fifteen greenish or light brown flowers with a white labellum. It is a very rare orchid with only six plants recorded in 1993.

Description
The edges of the upturned part of the labellum are slightly wavy and there is a thickened, fleshy green, channelled callus in its centre. Flowering occurs in November and December.

Taxonomy and naming
Prasophyllum perangustum was first formally described in 1998 by David Jones from a specimen collected near Knocklofty and the description was published in Australian Orchid Research. The specific epithet (perangustum) is derived from the Latin word angustum meaning "narrow" and the prefix per- meaning "very" referring to the very narrow labellum tip and callus.

Distribution and habitat
The Knocklofty leek orchid is only known from a single location near Knocklofty where it grows on steep slopes and ridges with grasses and shrubs in open forest.

Conservation
Prasophyllum perangustum was last seen in 1993 when six plants were recorded. It is classed as "Endangered" under the Tasmanian Threatened Species Protection Act 1995 and as Critically Endangered under the Commonwealth Government Environment Protection and Biodiversity Conservation Act 1999 (EPBC) Act. The main threats to the population are weed invasion, inappropriate fire regimes and track maintenance.

References

External links 
 

perangustum
Flora of Tasmania
Endemic orchids of Australia
Plants described in 1998